The Water Tower (originally known as the New Tower) is a 14th-century tower in Chester, Cheshire, England, which is attached by a spur wall to Bonewaldesthorne's Tower on the city walls.  The tower, together with its spur wall, is recorded in the National Heritage List for England as a designated Grade I listed building.  The original name of the tower was New Tower but in the 17th century it became known as the Water Tower, although the City Assembly tried to insist on the usage of its correct name.

History
The tower was built between 1322 and 1325, at which time it stood in the River Dee. It is attached to Bonewaldesthorne's Tower by a spur wall. The architect was John (de) Helpston who had also designed castles for King Edward II in North Wales. Its prime purpose was to defend the port of Chester, and it was also used to monitor the movements of shipping and to ensure that the custom dues were paid. The cost of the tower and the spur wall was £100 
(equivalent to £ as of ). By the end of the 16th century the river had silted up and the tower was landlocked. In 1639 the tower was renovated at the city's expense and during the following decade embrasures in the spur wall were made into gun ports. During the Civil War the tower was attacked and damaged. From 1671 it was leased as a storehouse but in 1728 it was described as "useless and neglected".

The Chester Mechanics' Institution was founded in 1835. The Institution wished to open a museum to show its artifacts and the city council leased the Water Tower and Bonewaldesthorne's Tower at a nominal rent for this purpose. The museum opened in 1838. The Institution closed in 1876 and the exhibits came into the possession of the city council. Although it was recognised that the tower was not suitable as a museum, there was at the time nowhere else to show all the exhibits. The tower closed as a museum in 1901–02 while the city walls were rebuilt, and re-opened in 1903, attracting 12,000 visitors that season. The towers were closed to the public in 1916 and in the 1920s they were let for non-museum use. In 1954 they were bought by the Grosvenor Museum which reopened them to the public in 1962. The Water Tower and the adjacent Bonewaldesthorne's Tower have housed a museum of the history of medicine, 'Sick to Death', since August 2016.

Architecture

The tower and spur wall are built in sandstone rubble. An archway in the city walls leads to 44 stone steps on the way down to the tower. The wall is crenellated; this may be the only surviving example of medieval crenellation on the city walls. The tower is circular at its base with a square turret above, in two stages containing octagonal chambers, one above the other. A pointed archway leads from the wall into the lower chamber. In the angle between the tower and the wall was a small latrine. Formerly in its walls were embrasures, but these have been blocked and are only visible from the exterior. A circular staircase of 23 steps leads to the upper chamber, which has four embrasures in its walls. Above this is a raised fighting platform overlooking the entrance to the tower. The top of the tower is crenellated.

See also

List of sections of Chester city walls and associated structures
Grade I listed buildings in Cheshire West and Chester

References

Buildings and structures completed in 1325
Towers completed in the 14th century
Water Tower
Grade I listed buildings in Chester
Grade I listed towers
Towers in Cheshire